

288001–288100 

|-bgcolor=#f2f2f2
| colspan=4 align=center | 
|}

288101–288200 

|-bgcolor=#f2f2f2
| colspan=4 align=center | 
|}

288201–288300 

|-bgcolor=#f2f2f2
| colspan=4 align=center | 
|}

288301–288400 

|-bgcolor=#f2f2f2
| colspan=4 align=center | 
|}

288401–288500 

|-id=478
| 288478 Fahlman ||  || Gregory Fahlman (born 1944) has served since 2003 as the Director General of the Herzberg Institute of Astrophysics, National Research Council of Canada. He has made extensive contributions to studies of globular star clusters using ground- and space-based telescopes. || 
|}

288501–288600 

|-bgcolor=#f2f2f2
| colspan=4 align=center | 
|}

288601–288700 

|-id=615
| 288615 Tempesti ||  || Piero Tempesti (1917–2011), an Italian astronomer and member of IAU's "Division V Variable Stars" and "Commission 27 Variable Stars" until his death in 2011. His research included minor planets and comets, as well as variable stars and novae (Src). || 
|}

288701–288800 

|-bgcolor=#f2f2f2
| colspan=4 align=center | 
|}

288801–288900 

|-bgcolor=#f2f2f2
| colspan=4 align=center | 
|}

288901–289000 

|-id=960
| 288960 Steponasdarius ||  || Steponas Darius (1896–1933), a Lithuanian American pilot, who, together with Stasys Girėnas  (see below), died in a non-stop flight attempt with the Lituanica from New York City to Kaunas, Lithuania, in 1933. The airplane crashed over Poland, after they crossed the Atlantic in 37 hours and completed nearly 90% of the journey. || 
|-id=961
| 288961 Stasysgirėnas ||  || Stasys Girėnas (1893–1933), a Lithuanian American pilot, who, together with Steponas Darius (see above), died in a non-stop flight attempt with the Lituanica from New York City to Kaunas, Lithuania, in 1933. The airplane crashed over Poland, after they crossed the Atlantic in 37 hours and completed nearly 90% of the journey. || 
|}

References 

288001-289000